Crassispira trencarti is a species of sea snail, a marine gastropod mollusc in the family Pseudomelatomidae.

Description
The length of the shell attains 12 mm.

Distribution
This marine species occurs off Senegal

References

 Ryall, P., Horro, J. & Rolàn, E., 2009. Two new species of Crassispira (Gastropoda, Conoidea) from West Africa with a taxonomic note on Crassispira tripter von Maltzan, 1883. Iberus 27(1): 131–139

External links
 

trencarti
Gastropods described in 2009